The Public Theater is a New York City arts organization founded as the Shakespeare Workshop in 1954 by Joseph Papp, with the intention of showcasing the works of up-and-coming playwrights and performers. Led by JoAnne Akalaitis from 1991 to 1993 and by George C. Wolfe from 1993 to 2004, it is currently led by Artistic Director Oskar Eustis and Executive Director Patrick Willingham. The venue opened in 1967, with the world-premiere production of the musical Hair as its first show.

The Public is headquartered at 425 Lafayette Street in the former Astor Library in Lower Manhattan. The building holds five theatre spaces and Joe's Pub, a cabaret-style venue used for new work, musical performances, spoken-word artists, and soloists. The Public also operates the Delacorte Theater in Central Park, where it presents Shakespeare in the Park. New York natives and visitors alike have been enjoying free Shakespeare in Central Park since performances began in 1954.

Notable productions in recent years include: The Merchant of Venice, featuring Al Pacino as Shylock (2010); Here Lies Love (2013), by David Byrne; Fun Home, adapted from Alison Bechdel's illustrated memoir of the same name (2013); Eclipsed, by Danai Gurira and featuring Lupita Nyong'o (2015); and Hamilton (2015), by Lin-Manuel Miranda.

Programs and series
In addition to each season of full-scale theatrical productions, The Public also produces a number of different series, festivals, and programs each year. 

In 2008, The Public presented its inaugural Public LAB series, an annual series of new plays presented in collaboration with LAByrinth Theater Company. With each Public LAB show, corresponding speaker series are presented as after-show talkbacks to discuss prominent themes, ideas and topics in the plays. A number of plays that have appeared in the Public LAB series have gone onto full-scale productions, including Tracey Scott Wilson’s The Good Negro, which ran at The Public in 2009, and Bloody Bloody Andrew Jackson, which had a sold-out, thrice-extended off-Broadway run at The Public in the spring of 2010 and transferred to Broadway that fall.

Public LAB was expanded in 2011 to include Public LAB SHAKESPEARE, a new platform for The Public's ongoing exploration of the Shakespeare canon that continues the growth of The Public's Shakespeare Initiative and expands the ways The Public produces American interpretations of Shakespeare. The premiere production of Public LAB SHAKESPEARE was Timon of Athens in March 2011, featuring Richard Thomas in the title role.

In 2013, The Public launched the Mobile Shakespeare Unit (now renamed Mobile Unit), which tours free Shakespeare to various locations throughout the five boroughs, including prisons, homeless shelters, and community centers, before concluding its run at the Public Theater itself. Past venues include Rikers Island, Borden Avenue's Veteran's Shelter, and The Fortune Society. The Public also launched its inaugural Public Works production in 2013. Public Works combines diverse groups of people throughout the five boroughs of New York City to watch theatre, participate in theatrical workshops, and perform in one full-scale Public Works production alongside professional actors at Shakespeare in the Park. Past Public Works productions include The Tempest, The Winter's Tale, and The Odyssey.

The Public Forum, begun in 2010, is a series of lectures, debates, and conversations that showcase leading voices in the arts, politics and the media. Curated by Jeremy McCarter, a senior writer at Newsweek, Public Forum events explore issues raised by plays in The Public's season, as well as the political and cultural headlines of today's world. Notable participants in the series include Stephen Sondheim, Tony Kushner, Arianna Huffington, Alec Baldwin and Anne Hathaway.

The Public hosts the annual Under the Radar Festival, a festival tracking new theater from around the world. 

Over the last 12 years, The Public's Under the Radar Festival (UTR) has presented over 194 companies from 40 countries. UTR has presented works by such respected artists as Elevator Repair Service, Gob Squad, Belarus Free Theatre, and Young Jean Lee.

The Public serves as the home of the Emerging Writers Group, which seeks to target playwrights at the earliest stages in their careers. The Emerging Writers Group is a component of The Public Writers Initiative.

The Public also fosters Public Studio, a performance series dedicated to developing the works of new and emerging theater artists. Emerging playwrights get the opportunity to stage a piece somewhere between a workshop and a full production in front of an audience, as an opportunity to gage audience reaction and further develop their work.

The Public Theater invests in theater education, training classical actors through the annual summer acting intensive known as the Shakespeare Lab. The Shakespeare Lab is The Public Theater's professional actor development program that immerses a selected company of professional, mid-career actors in a summer intensive exploring the rigors, challenges, and joys of performing Shakespeare.

The Public Theater hosts educational programs for teenagers such as Shakespeare Spring Break, Summer ShakeUP, and A Midsummer Day's Camp programs, all for teenagers interested in learning about and performing Shakespeare.

Suzan-Lori Parks, Pulitzer Prize-winning playwright and Master Writer Chair of The Public, debuted her performance piece Watch Me Work as part of the 2011 Under The Radar Festival. In the performance, Parks worked on her newest writing project in the main lobby of The Public Theater.

Notable works and awards
A number of the Public's productions have moved to larger Broadway theaters upon the conclusion of their run at Astor Place. The three most commercially successful of these works have been Hair (1967), A Chorus Line (1975), and Hamilton (2015).

The Public Theater has won 54 Tony Awards, 152 Obie Awards, 42 Drama Desk Awards and five Pulitzer Prizes. Fifty-five Public Theater productions have moved to Broadway, including Sticks and Bones, That Championship Season, A Chorus Line, For Colored Girls Who Have Considered Suicide When the Rainbow Is Enuf, The Pirates of Penzance, The Tempest, Bring in 'da Noise, Bring in 'da Funk, Michael John LaChiusa's The Wild Party, The Ride Down Mt. Morgan, Topdog/Underdog, Take Me Out, Caroline, or Change, Passing Strange, the revival of HAIR, Bloody Bloody Andrew Jackson, The Merchant of Venice, The Normal Heart, Well, Fun Home, Hamilton, and Eclipsed.

Astor Library Building

The Public has been housed in a landmarked Romanesque revival structure at 425 Lafayette Street since 1967, built between 1853 and 1881 as the Astor Library, which later merged with the Tilden and Lenox collections to become the New York Public Library. The library was built by William B. Astor, son of the library's founder, John Jacob Astor. A German-born architect, Alexander Saeltzer, who had been the architect of the Anshe Chesed Synagogue,
 designed the building in Rundbogenstil style, then the prevailing style for public building in Germany. Astor funded two expansions of the building toward Astor Place, designed by Griffith Thomas (1856–1869) and Thomas Stent (1879–1881). Both large expansions followed Saeltzer's original design so seamlessly that an observer cannot detect that the edifice was built in three stages.

In 1920, the Hebrew Immigrant Aid Society purchased the building. By 1965, it was in disuse and faced demolition. The Public Theater, then the New York Shakespeare Festival, persuaded the city to purchase it for use as a theater. It was converted for theater use by Giorgio Cavaglieri between 1967 and 1976.

The building is a New York City Landmark, designated in 1965. It was one of the first buildings to be recognized as such by the newly formed Landmarks Preservation Commission of New York City.

In 2009, The Public began its "Going Public" campaign to raise funds for a major renovation of the historic building. Groundbreaking for the $35 million renovation occurred on March 9, 2010, with notables such as Liev Schreiber and Philip Seymour Hoffman in attendance. Plans included a renovation of Joe's Pub; the Pub went on a three-month hiatus during the summer of 2011 to allow for construction. The building re-opened on October 4, 2012 after a renovation designed by Ennead Architects costing $40 million.

Public Works productions

In 2013, The Public launched Public Works, which brings together diverse groups of people throughout the five boroughs of New York City to watch theatre, participate in theatrical workshops, and perform in one full-scale Public Works production alongside professional actors at Shakespeare in the Park. Past Public Works productions include The Tempest, The Winter's Tale, and The Odyssey.

References

External links

Off-Broadway theaters
Theatre companies in New York City
Performing groups established in 1954
Theatres completed in 1967
New York City Designated Landmarks in Manhattan
Theatres on the National Register of Historic Places in Manhattan
Astor Place